Vincenzo Dandini (1607–1675) was an Italian painter of the Baroque period, active mainly in Florence. He was a pupil of his brother, Cesare Dandini in Florence, then he moved to Rome and worked in the studio of Pietro da Cortona. Among his pupils were Giovanni Battista Marmi and Antonio Domenico Gabbiani. His nephew Pietro and his two children, Ottaviano and Vincezo the younger, also worked as painters in his studio.

He painted an Immaculate Conception and other canvases for the church of Ognissanti, Florence. He painted a fresco of the Aurora and the Hours for the Villa del Poggio Imperiale. He painted a canvas on oil of Sacrifice of Niobe for the Villa La Petraja.

References

biography of Cesare

1607 births
1675 deaths
17th-century Italian painters
Italian male painters
Painters from Florence
Italian Baroque painters